The following is a list of awards and nominations received by Ugandan film director, screenwriter, and producer Usama Mukwaya. His major nominations include the African Movie Academy Award.

Major associations

Africa Movie Academy Awards

The Africa Movie Academy Awards, popularly known as AMAA and The AMA Awards, are presented annually to recognize excellence of professionals in the African film industry.

Other awards and nominations

Ikon Awards
The iKON Awards - Film & Television is an awarding programme founded by Humphrey Nabimanya that recognizes and rewards implementers and personalities in the Film and Television and Mainstream Media in Uganda and ultimately, Afrika. Formally The iKon awards is an initiative, The new annual initiative is now presented by SAUTIplus Media Hub.

Janzi Awards
The Janzi Awards are envisioned as an inclusive experience where outstanding achievements, innovations and diversity in Uganda’s Cultural, Creative and Performing Arts forms are recognized and celebrated.

Viewers Choice Movie Awards (Uganda)

Film festival awards

Africa International Film Festival

The Africa International Film Festival (AFRIFF) is an annual film festival. The event normally spans through a week and it includes award shows and film training classes.

Amakula International Film Festival
The Amakula International Film Festival is an annual film festival that takes place in Uganda. It is Uganda's oldest film festival founded by Dutch film historian Alice Smits and American filmmaker Lee Elickson.

Durban International Film Festival
The Durban International Film Festival (DIFF) is an annual film festival that takes place in Durban, KwaZulu-Natal province, South Africa. Founded in 1979 by Teddy Sarkin and Ros Sarkin, it is the oldest and largest film festival in Africa and presents over 200 screenings celebrating the best in South African, African and international cinema. Most of the screenings are either African or South African premieres.

Helsinki African Film Festival

Luxor African Film Festival

Mashariki African Film Festival
Mashariki African Film Festival is an international film festival based in Rwanda, that represent the country in the East African Film Network (EAFN).

Nador Cinema Festival

Nile Diaspora International Film Festival

Pearl International Film Festival
The Pearl International Film Festival (PIFF), is an annual film festival held in Kampala, Uganda and has been described as one of the biggest film events in Uganda.

Uganda Film Festival
The Uganda Film Festival (UFF), is an annual film festival held in Kampala, Uganda founded under the Uganda Communications Commission. The festival is intended to help showcase what the industry is doing and at the same time focusing attention to all the other facets of the industry.

Film industry awards

MNFPAC

Mariam Ndagire Film and Performing Arts Centre is a Uganda-based training film initiative for emerging Ugandan filmmakers and mentorship programme for aspiring filmmakers and youth in Uganda.

Movie Furnace

Movie Furnace (Tanuulu) is a Uganda-based non-profit short film competition, for Mariam Ndagire Film and Performing Arts Centre alumni (MNFPAC), founded by Mariam Ndagire.

Miscellaneous awards and honors

Trailblazer Award - MNFPAC (CLASS OF 2010)
The Mariam Ndagire Film and Performing Arts Centre awarded Usama the trailblazer award during the institutes' 2020 graduation as an exceptional student for his outstanding contribution towards the Ugandan entertainment industry. On the very event, Usama received a diploma in film directing and screenwriting from now a fully recognized training institute by Directorate of Industrial Training.

Fellow of the Young & Emerging Leaders Project (CLASS OF 2019)
The Young & Emerging Leaders Project (YELP) is an initiative of the LéO Africa Institute, which has been ongoing since 2017, that annually inducts 20-30 outstanding thought leaders into a fellowship program designed to train and orient values of self-advancement, integrity, social responsibility, and socioeconomic transformation.

Film and Television Award - Young Achievers Awards 2011 
The Young Achievers Awards is a national competition held annually in Uganda which selects and promotes the best practice and excellence in youth creativity.

See also

References

Usama Mukwaya
Mukwaya, Usama
Mukwaya, Usama
Mukwaya, Usama